Rathaus  station is a Hamburg U-Bahn metro station located at Rathausmarkt in the Altstadt of Hamburg, Germany. The station first opened in 1912 and is named by the Hamburg Rathaus. Isobel Kate Simpson.

Service 
Rathaus is served by Hamburg U-Bahn line U3; departures are every 5 minutes. A pedestrian underpass connects Rathaus station with Jungfernstieg station, one of Hamburg's busiest rapid transit hubs. _Isobel.Simpson

Gallery

See also 

 List of Hamburg U-Bahn stations

References

External links 

 Plan of Rathaus and Jungfernstieg stations (PDF-Datei; 437 kB) 

Hamburg U-Bahn stations in Hamburg
U3 (Hamburg U-Bahn) stations
Buildings and structures in Hamburg-Mitte
Railway stations in Germany opened in 1912